Fiolent, was the home ground of the now defunct Ukrainian football club of FC Ihroservice Simferopol. The ground opened for use on April 1, 1935. The former names it carried were Synie pole (Blue field), Kharchovyk (Food dealer), Avant-garde, Meteor. It can hold 5,000 spectators. Size of the field is 105m x 68m.

Ukrainian Second League club Zhemchuzhyna Yalta moved their home games in the 2012–13 season from Round 16 onwards while their home ground was under pitch reconstruction.

References 

1935 establishments in Ukraine
Football venues in Crimea
Sport in Simferopol
Buildings and structures in Simferopol
Sports venues in Crimea